In enzymology, a mRNA (nucleoside-2'-O-)-methyltransferase is an enzyme that catalyzes the chemical reaction

S-adenosyl-L-methionine + m7G(5')pppR-RNA  S-adenosyl-L-homocysteine + m7G(5')pppRm-RNA (mRNA containing a 2'-O-methylpurine cap)

Thus, the two substrates of this enzyme are S-adenosyl methionine and m7G(5')pppR-RNA, whereas its two products are S-adenosylhomocysteine and m7G(5')pppRm-RNA (mRNA containing a 2'-O-methylpurine cap).

This enzyme belongs to the family of transferases, specifically those transferring one-carbon group methyltransferases.  The systematic name of this enzyme class is S-adenosyl-L-methionine:mRNA (nucleoside-2'-O-)-methyltransferase. Other names in common use include messenger ribonucleate nucleoside 2'-methyltransferase, and messenger RNA (nucleoside-2'-)-methyltransferase.

Structural studies

References

 
 
 
 
 

EC 2.1.1
Enzymes of known structure